Edward B. Bell (March 25, 1931 – November 16, 2009) was a professional American football player.  A halfback, he played college football at the University of Pennsylvania.  Professionally, he played for the National Football League's Philadelphia Eagles from 1955 through 1958, and for the New York Titans of the American Football League in 1960.

Bell played one season in the Canadian Football League in 1959 with the Hamilton Tiger-Cats and was selected as an All-Star at linebacker.

See also
List of American Football League players

References

1931 births
American football running backs
American football defensive backs
Penn Quakers football players
Philadelphia Eagles players
New York Titans (AFL) players
Hamilton Tiger-Cats players
2009 deaths
Players of American football from Philadelphia